LoiLo is a Japanese video editing software creation and development company. The founders of this company are from games industry. LoiLoScope is a game technology-based video editing software.

LoiLo products include LoiLoScope, LoiLo Education (with NHK, Japan's national public broadcasting organization), LoiLo Touch and Smooth (Adobe AE plugin).

History
LoiLo was founded by 2 brothers who worked in games industry in April 2007.

Products
 Super LoiLoScope
 LoiLoScope (latest version released in 2011)
 LoiLo Education
 LoiLo Touch
 Smooth (Adobe AE plugin)
 LoiLoGameRecorder

External links
 Official site

Software companies of Japan